Grudë (also known as Grudë Fushe) is a settlement in the former Gruemirë municipality, Shkodër County, northern Albania. At the 2015 local government reform it became part of the municipality Malësi e Madhe. In 1485, the village's inhabitants maintained Albanian anthroponomy, indicating Albanians inhabited the village during this time.

References

Gruemirë
Populated places in Malësi e Madhe
Villages in Shkodër County

sq:Grudë